Arto Heiskanen (23 November 1963  – 8 February 2023) was a Finnish professional ice hockey left winger.

Heiskanen played a total of 487 games in the SM-liiga for Ässät and Lukko. He played in the French Élite Ligue for Brest Albatros Hockey, the British Ice Hockey Superleague for the Newcastle Cobras and the Polska Hokej Liga for the SMS Warszawa.

Career statistics

References

External links

1963 births
2023 deaths
Ässät players
Brest Albatros Hockey players
Finnish ice hockey left wingers
Lukko players
Newcastle Cobras players
People from Savonlinna
SaPKo players
SMS Warszawa players
Sportspeople from South Savo